Dewald Brevis (born 29 April 2003) is a South African cricketer. Brevis is also known as 'Baby AB' for his playing resemblance to AB de Villiers.

Career

In April 2021, he was signed by Northerns ahead of the 2021–22 domestic cricket season in South Africa. He made his Twenty20 debut on 8 October 2021, for the South Africa Under-19s in the 2021–22 CSA Provincial T20 Knock-Out tournament.

In November 2021, Brevis was named in South Africa's team for the 2022 ICC Under-19 Cricket World Cup in the West Indies. During the tournament, he scored two centuries and three fifties, and was named the Player of the Tournament, after scoring 506 runs. In February 2022, Brevis was bought by the Mumbai Indians in the 2022 Indian Premier League auction. In July 2022, he was signed by the Kandy Falcons for the third edition of the Lanka Premier League.

Records and achievements
 Most runs in an Under-19 Cricket World Cup series. He scored 506 runs in the 2022 ICC Under-19 Cricket World Cup.
 On 22 September 2022, Brevis made 30 runs off 6 balls for St Kitts and Nevis Patriots against Trinbago Knight Riders in the 2022 Caribbean Premier League which is the second-fastest (in terms of strike-rate) innings for any batter in T20 cricket who has scored 30+ runs.
 Brevis' 162 is the highest T20 score made in South Africa.
 Brevis' 162 against Knights in 2022 is the joint 3rd best T20 score ever.
 Brevis took 52 balls to reach 150 in his knock of 162, the fastest by any batter in T20 cricket history.
 At 19 years and 185 days old, Brevis became the youngest South African to score a century in men's T20s.

Honours
 CSA T20 Challenge winner 2022–23 runner-up 2021–22
 6IXTY T10 cricket tournament winner 2022

References

External links
 

2003 births
Living people
South African cricketers
Cricketers from Johannesburg
Titans cricketers
Mumbai Indians cricketers
MI Cape Town cricketers